Château d'Oche can refer to:

 Château d'Oche a mountain in Haute-Savoie, France.
 Château d'Oche a château in Dordogne, France.